I'm Easy may refer to:

Albums
 I'm Easy (album), 1976 album by Keith Carradine
 I'm Easy, a 2007 compilation album by Clarence Carter

Songs
 "I'm Easy" (Keith Carradine song), 1975, from the film Nashville
 "I'm Easy" (Faith No More song), a version of the Commodores song "Easy"
 "I'm Easy", a song by Boz Scaggs from Boz Scaggs
 "I'm Easy", a song by Brendan Benson from Lapalco 
 "I'm Easy", a song by Pink Cream 69 from Food for Thought
 "I'm Easy", a song by The Meligrove Band from Planets Conspire